Demming is a surname. Notable people with the surname include:

Alfons Demming (1928–2012), German Roman Catholic titular bishop
Chantal Demming (born 1978), Dutch actress
Ellen Demming (1922–2002), American actress
Jevon Demming (born 1989), British Virgin Islands footballer
Robert Demming (born 1947), English cricketer

See also
Demmings
Deming (disambiguation)